In Europe, Google Street View began on 2 July 2008 with the route of Tour de France being covered in parts of France and Italy. The service has since expanded to many European countries, while at the same time has been controversial in some countries laws and privacy concerns.

Development 

Early on, soon following the original introduction of Street View in the United States, there was talk of bringing the feature to Europe as well, but there were concerns over the legality of the feature due to stricter laws in most European countries than those of the United States regarding photography.

The first views anywhere outside the United States were introduced on July 2, 2008, when the Tour de France route was added. Nineteen camera icons, each indicating part of a French city or town and Cuneo, Italy, were included.

On October 14, 2008, camera icons were introduced in six French cities, Lille, Lyon, Marseille, Nice, Paris and Toulouse. At the same time, all other icons that had been introduced in France on July 2, as well as the one in Cuneo, Italy, were removed, representing the first time in Street View's history that a camera icon that once marked a place was removed. However, the amount of coverage that France had since July 2 was not diminished.

On October 27, 2008, four Spanish metropolitan areas were added to the list of growing street view locations in Europe: Madrid, Barcelona, Seville and Valencia.

On October 29, 2008, Italy received four camera icons for the localities of Florence, Milan, Rome and Lake Como.

On March 18, 2009, the United Kingdom and the Netherlands were added. In the case of Great Britain, only major centres were uploaded and even coverage of those city centres was incomplete. For example, Edinburgh was missing Street View images of two of its key thoroughfares: Princes Street and the Royal Mile (although portions of both were visible from adjoining streets that had been imaged).

In May 2009, Google Germany released a list of German cities that were to be scanned or rescanned in May and June 2009.

On August 18, 2009, areas in Switzerland and Portugal were added.

On October 7, 2009, parts of the Czech Republic were added.

On November 9, 2009, more locations in the Netherlands and Spain were added.

On December 2, 2009, more locations in France and Italy were added as well as various tourist sites in England.

On January 20, 2010, Sweden and Denmark were added, as well as more locations in the United Kingdom, Italy (7 regions are fully covered), Portugal, the Czech Republic (mostly Prague), and the Netherlands.

On February 9, 2010, Norway and Finland were added, with coverage of much of southern Norway and most of Finland. Imagery was updated for parts of the UK as well.

On March 11, 2010, 95% of the United Kingdom's roads, both rural and urban, covering a total of approximately 238,000 miles, were added. More locations in the Netherlands were also added.

On April 15, 2010, some major UK theme parks were added including Alton Towers, Thorpe Park, Chessington World of Adventures, and Legoland Windsor, as well as the Sea Life Centre in Weymouth.

In May 2010, Google Street View Cars and Trikes were seen in Croatian cities and towns such as Pula, Split, Dubrovnik, and the capital, Zagreb. This brings a Street View September dream to both Croatia and Andorra available.

In August 2010, Google Street View Cars were photographing Jersey, Guernsey and Alderney as well as Slovakia. Also, ten Street View cars were delivered to the Latvian capital Riga.

On September 30, 2010, the Republic of Ireland was added.

On December 8, 2010, parts of Romania were added. More locations in the Netherlands, Denmark, and Norway were also added.

On February 1, 2011, Street Views were added of several art museums across Europe, including the Palace of Versailles, the State Hermitage Museum, the Uffizi Gallery and Tate Britain.

In October 2011, the Bernina Railway between St. Moritz and Tirano was photographed and was added to Street View in early 2012. Bernina Railway is part of the Rhaetian Railway and a UNESCO World Heritage Site.

On November 23, 2011, Street View became available for almost all of Belgium. While Street View content had been recorded earlier, privacy issues kept Google from making it available to the public.

On February 22, 2012, Street View became available for 3 major cities in Russia: St. Petersburg, Moscow, and small parts of Kazan. Museum views were made available in Russia in 2011 for St. Petersburg's Hermitage Museum and Moscow's Tretyakov Gallery.
Street Views of Piotrkowska Street in Łódź, Poland were also released.

On March 21, 2012, Street View became available in Poland for most major cities and landmarks.

On April 19, 2012, 5 Ukrainian cities were added: Donetsk, Lviv, Kharkiv, Kyiv, and Odessa.

On May 14, 2012, Estonia and Latvia were added.  Nearby Lithuania is currently being photographed.

On September 26, 2012, Croatia and Andorra were added.

On October 30, 2012, Slovakia was added.

On January 31, 2013, Lithuania was added.

On March 8, 2013, Bulgaria and most major cities of Russia were added.

On April 23, 2013, Hungary was added. The Kaliningrad Oblast exclave of Russia was also added and almost all places in Poland and Romania, except for the major cities added earlier.

On October 10, 2013, Iceland was added.

On November 15, 2013, Venice was added, with photographs taken by backpackers and gondolas.

On January 29, 2014 Slovenia and even more areas of Russia were added.

On June 5, 2014, Greece was added.

On July 23, 2014, Serbia was added, with coverage of the three largest cities (Belgrade, Novi Sad and Niš).

On August 20, 2014, more locations in Belgium, Denmark, and Hungary were added. Various waterfalls, geysers, and trails in Iceland were also added.

On September 26, 2014, more locations in Denmark, Hungary and the Netherlands were added.

On October 23, 2014, Luxembourg was added.

On January 21, 2015, more locations in Russia and Romania were added.

On February 18, 2015, more locations in Serbia and Russia were added.

On October 8, 2015, North Macedonia was added. More locations in the Ukraine were also added.

On October 22, 2015, Turkey was added. More locations in Bulgaria were also added.

On November 10, 2016, Albania was added.

On October 28, 2017, Malta and the Faeroe Islands were added.

On July 11, 2018, Austria was added.

On October 26, 2019 Belarus was added with a small coverage of the historical center of Minsk.

Timeline of introductions 

Note: Nearly all locations in Europe are available in high quality view.

Areas included 
Reference:

Most towns, cities, villages, major and rural roads

Some indoor museum and garden views in Vienna (Volksgarten, Burgtheater, Schönbrunn and more). Ski pistes at the Sölden and Ischgl resorts, Österreichring race track. In general without people in the images.

General streets and roads were published years after most European countries, due to legal issues. In July 2018 images from Vienna, Graz, Klagenfurt, Linz, Wiener Neustadt, Eisenstadt, Baden bei Wien, Villach and Salzburg were published, as well as some roads in Vorarlberg and Tirol and the cc.

On June 18, 2020, Street View published major roads and highways all throughout Austria, in every state.

Most towns, cities, villages, major and rural roads

Most towns, cities, villages, major and rural roads

In 2022, Google started Capturing images again after 11 years.

Most towns, cities and major roads

Most towns, cities, villages, major and rural roads

Most towns, cities, villages, major and rural roads. Several small rural roads are missing in Bornholm.

The Faroe Islands has high coverage, also for minor roads. Tórshavn, Klaksvík, Hoyvík, Argir, Vágur, Vestmanna, Tvøroyri, Miðvágur, Sørvágur, Toftir, Saltangará, Kollafjørður, Strendur, Sandavágur, Hvalba, Eiði, Sandur, and more locations in the Faroe Islands

Greenland also has some coverage, described in Google Street View in North America.

Most towns, cities, villages, major and rural roads

Most towns, cities, villages, major and rural roads

Most towns, cities, villages, major and rural roads

Some overseas areas have coverage. See Google Street View in Africa, Google Street View in North America and Google Street View in Oceania.

Due to legal and other issues, coverage is mostly restricted to major cities. Recently unofficial Street view has been added by various providers, covering various areas of Germany. In this table Street view provided only by Google is shown:

However, since 2017, there is an expanding coverage in various areas of Germany, mostly in the states of the former West Germany, provided by various users and providers unaffiliated with Google (unofficial coverage).

Most towns, cities, villages, major and rural roads

Most towns, cities, villages, major and rural roads

Most towns, cities, villages, major and rural roads

Most towns, cities, villages, major and rural roads

Most towns, cities, villages, major and rural roads

The Zollstrasse bridge is covered along 70 meters in Liechtenstein, as well as some of the town of Balzers and the road into it.

Most towns, cities, villages, major and rural roads

Most towns, cities, villages, major and rural roads

Most towns, cities, villages, major and rural roads

Most towns, cities, villages, major and rural roads

Most major, minor roads

Major towns and roads

Most towns, cities, villages, major and rural roads

Major towns and roads

Most towns, cities, villages, major and rural roads

No coverage in Svalbard and Jan Mayen, apart from photo spheres

Most towns, cities, villages, major and rural roads

Most towns, cities, villages, major and rural roads.

This includes the main islands of Madeira and Azores.

Most towns, cities, villages, major and rural roads



Most towns, cities, villages, major and rural roads



Most towns, cities, villages, major and rural roads

In 2021 and 2022, Google started Capturing images again.

Most towns, cities, villages, major and rural roads. This includes the Balearic Islands and the Canary Islands.

Ceuta and Melilla have some coverage.

Most towns, cities, villages, major and rural roads

Most towns, cities, villages, major and rural roads. See Google Street View in Asia#Turkey.

Most towns, cities, villages, major and rural roads. Many small gaps in residential areas.

Most towns, cities, major roads, some villages and rural roads.

Most towns, cities, villages, major and rural roads. Including Gibraltar, Jersey and Isle of Man.

However, many rural and suburban areas have not been updated since 2009/10.

For overseas territories, see articles about other continents.

Controversy 
Street View has been controversial in different countries for various reasons.

In September 2010, the Czech Republic banned any further capturing of Street View images. This occurred after more than half a year of unsuccessful negotiation between the Czech Republic and Google.

In November 2010, a British watchdog group said that Google broke the law by obtaining personal data from people. The British government said the company would not be fined for the breach.

In March 2011, legal action against Google Street View in Germany resulted in court ruling that the project is legal; however, Google later decided not to expand or update existing coverage of Germany by the service.

In April 2011, a temporary ban on Google Street View data collecting in Austria was lifted, after being imposed by national data protection agency in May 2010. Google announced it was satisfied with the decision, but also stated that it had no plans to offer Google Street View coverage in Austria in the foreseeable future. In July 2018 general street coverage was introduced in Austria.

In April 2013 Google was fined €145,000 for illegally recording information from unsecured wireless networks in Germany.

There is some criticism of privacy concerns as well.

References 

Europe
Maps of Europe
Geography of Europe
Communications in Europe